Poshteh-ye Olya (also Romanized as Poshteh-ye ‘Olyā; also known as Poshteh-ye Bālā) is a village in Chalanchulan Rural District, Silakhor District, Dorud County, Lorestan Province, Iran. At the 2006 census, its population was 79, in 17 families.

References 

Towns and villages in Dorud County